The Thyrididae comprise the family of picture-winged leaf moths. They are the only family in the superfamily Thyridoidea, which sometimes has been included in the Pyraloidea, but this isn't supported by cladistic analysis.

Most species live in the tropics and subtropics. They are colourful and often day-flying moths. There are four subfamilies. Their biology is little known. Thyridid specimens are rare in museum collections.

Genera
Chrysotypus Butler, 1879
Microctenucha Warren, 1900

Charideinae
Amalthocera Boisduval, 1836
Arniocera Hopffer, 1857
Byblisia Walker, 1865
Cicinnocnemis Holland, 1894
Dilophura Hampson, 1918
Lamprochrysa Hampson, 1918
Marmax Rafinesque, 1815
Netrocera Felder, 1874
Toosa Walker, 1856
Trichobaptes Holland, 1894

Siculodinae
Belonoptera Herrich-Schäffer, [1858]
Bupota Whalley, 1971 
Calindoea Walker, 1863
Cecidothyris Aurivillius, 1910
Collinsa Whalley, 1964 
Cornuterus Whalley, 1971
Draconia Hübner, 1820
Epaena Karsch, 1900
Gnathodes Whalley, 1971
Hapana Whalley, 1967
Hypolamprus Hampson, 1892
Kalenga Whalley, 1971
Kuja Whalley, 1971
Lelymena Karsch, 1900
Morova Walker, 1865 
Nakawa Whalley, 1971
Nemea Whalley, 1971
Opula Walker, 1869
Pyrinioides Butler, 1881
Rhodoneura Guenée, 1858
Siculodes Guenée, 1858
Symphleps Warren, 1897
Tridesmodes Warren, 1899
Zeuzerodes Pagenstecher, 1892

Striglininae
Banisia Walker, 1863
Jamboina Whalley, 1976
Macrogonia Herrich-Schäffer, 1855
Mathoris Guenée, 1877
Monodecus Whalley, 1976
Mystina Whalley, 1976
Rhodogonia Warren, 1897
Speculina Whalley, 1976
Striglina Guneée, 1877
Tanyodes Möschler, 1882
Tristina Whalley, 1976

Thyridinae
Dysodia Clemens, 1860 (includes Platythyris)
Glanycus Walker, 1855
Sijua Whalley, 1971
Thyris Laspeyrés, 1803

References

Firefly Encyclopedia of Insects and Spiders, edited by Christopher O'Toole, 2002

External links
TOL
ACG Page of images of Thyrididae from Area de Conservación Guanacaste, Costa Rica.
 Hexeris enhydris, seagrape borer on the UF / IFAS Featured Creatures Web site

 
Moth families
Obtectomera